Erhard Seminars Training (marketed as est, though often encountered as EST or Est) was an organization, founded by Werner Erhard in 1971, that offered a two-weekend (6-day, 60-hour) course known officially as "The est Standard Training". The seminar aimed to "transform one's ability to experience living so that the situations one had been trying to change or had been putting up with clear up just in the process of life itself". An est website claims that the training "brought to the forefront the ideas of transformation, personal responsibility, accountability, and possibility".

Est seminars operated from late 1971 to late 1984, and spawned a number of books from 1976 to 2011. Est has been featured in a number of films and television shows, including the critically acclaimed spy-series The Americans, broadcast from 2013 to 2018. Est represented an outgrowth of the Human Potential Movement of the 1960s through to the 1970s.

As est grew, so did criticism of it. In 1977, the film Semi-Tough, which parodied the then-popular course, was released. Various critics accused est of mind control or of forming an authoritarian army; some labeled it a cult.

The last est training took place in December 1984 in San Francisco. The seminars gave way to a "gentler" course offered by Werner Erhard and Associates and dubbed "The Forum", which began in January 1985.

Training 
The est Standard Training program consisted of two weekend-long workshops with evening sessions on the intervening weekdays. Workshops generally involved about 200 participants and were initially led by Erhard and later by people trained by him. Ronald Heifetz, founder of the Center for Public Leadership at Harvard University, called est "an important experience in which two hundred people go through a powerful curriculum over two weekends and have a learning experience that seemed to change many of their lives." Trainers confronted participants one-on-one and challenged them to be themselves rather than to play a role that had been imposed on them by the past.

Jonathan D. Moreno observed that "participants might have been surprised how both physically and emotionally challenging and how philosophical the training was." He writes that the critical part of the training was freeing oneself from the past, which was accomplished by "experiencing" one's recurrent patterns and problems and choosing to change them. The word experience meant to bring into full awareness the repetition of old, burdensome behaviors. The seminar sought to enable participants to shift the state of mind around which their lives were organized, from attempts to get satisfaction or to survive, to actually being satisfied and experiencing themselves as whole and complete in the present moment.

Participants agreed to follow the ground rules, which included not wearing watches, not speaking until called upon, not talking to their neighbors, and not eating or leaving their seats to go to the bathroom except during breaks separated by many hours. Participants who were on medication were exempt from these rules, and had to sit in the back row, so that they would not interfere with the other participants. These classroom agreements provided a rigorous setting whereby people's ordinary ways to escape confronting their experience of themselves were eliminated. Moreno describes the est training as a form of "Socratic interrogation...relying on the power of the shared cathartic experience that Aristotle observed."  Erhard challenged participants to be themselves instead of playing a role that had been imposed on them and aimed to press people beyond their point of view, into a perspective from which they could observe their own positionality. As Robert Kiyosaki writes, "During the training, it became glaringly clear that most of our personal problems begin with our not keeping our agreements, not being true to our words, saying one thing and doing another. That first full day on the simple class agreements was painfully enlightening. It became obvious that much of human misery is a function of broken agreements – not keeping your word, or someone else not keeping theirs."

Sessions lasted from 9:00 a.m. to midnight, or to the early hours of the morning, with one meal-break. Participants had to hand over wristwatches and were not allowed to take notes, or to speak unless called upon, in which case they waited for a microphone to be brought to them. The second day of the workshop featured the "danger process". As a way of observing and confronting their own perspective and point of view, groups of participants were brought onto the stage and confronted.  They were asked to "imagine that they were afraid of everyone else and then that everyone else was afraid of them" and to re-examine their reflex patterns of living that kept their lives from working.  This was followed by interactions on the third and fourth days, covering topics such as reality and the nature of the mind, looking at the possibility that "what is, is and what ain't, ain't," and that "true enlightenment is knowing you are a machine" and culminating in a realization that people do not need to be stuck with their automatic ways of being but can instead be free to choose their ways of being in how they live their lives.  Participants were told they were perfect the way they were and were asked to indicate by a show of hands if they "had gotten it".

Eliezer Sobel said in his article "This is It: est, 20 Years Later": I considered the training to be a brilliantly conceived Zen koan, effectively tricking the mind into seeing itself, and in thus seeing, to be simultaneously aware of who was doing the seeing, a transcendent level of consciousness, a place spacious and undefined, distinct from the tired old story that our minds continuously tell us about who we are, and with which we ordinarily identify.

Participants' reported results
Many participants reported experiencing powerful results through their participation in the est training, characterised by Eliezer Sobel as perceived "dramatic transformations in their relationships with their families, with their work and personal vision, or most important, with the recognition who they truly were in the core of their beings".  One study of "a large sample of est alumni who had completed the training at least 3 months before revealed that "the large majority felt the experience had been positive (88%), and considered themselves better off for having taken the training (80%)".

History 
Werner Erhard reported having a personal transformation, and created the est training to allow others to have the same experience. The first est course was held at a Jack Tar Hotel in San Francisco, California, in October 1971. Within a year, trainings were being held in New York City and other major cities in the United States followed soon after. They were carried out by Werner Erhard, who had recently resigned from Mind Dynamics.

Beginning in July 1974 the est training was delivered at the U.S. Penitentiary at Lompoc, California, with the approval of the Federal Bureau of Prisons.  Initial est training in Lompoc involved participation of 12–15 federal prisoners and outside community members within the walls of the maximum security prison and was personally conducted by Werner Erhard.

By 1979, est had expanded to Europe and other parts of the world. In 1980 the first est training in Israel was offered in Tel Aviv. The est training presented several concepts to these new attendees, most notably the concept of spiritual transformation and taking responsibility for one's life. The actual teaching, called "the technology of transformation," emphasizes the value of integrity. As est grew, so did criticism. It was accused of mind control and labeled a cult by some critics who said that it exploited its followers by recruiting and offering numerous "graduate seminars."

In 1983 in the United States, a participant named Jack Slee collapsed during a portion of the seminar known as "the danger process" and died at the hospital to which he had been transported. A court subsequently found that the est training was not the cause of death. A jury later ruled that Erhard and his company had been negligent, but did not give Slee's estate a monetary award.

According to a 1991 report by the Los Angeles Times, est had been the target of a smear campaign by the Church of Scientology. This campaign had spanned several years, with examples being found in documents seized by the FBI in 1977. This smear campaign involved hiring personal investigators to spy on Erhard, recruiting Scientologists to covertly enroll in and disrupt est courses, and compiling information from disgruntled former est participants which could be used to discredit est. Scientology founder L. Ron Hubbard (who died in 1986) believed that Erhard had copied Scientology. Erhard disputed this, saying that est was essentially different despite some similarities.

In their 1992 book Perspectives on the New Age James R. Lewis and J. Gordon Melton said that similarities between est and Mind Dynamics were "striking", as both used "authoritarian trainers who enforce numerous rules," require applause after participants "share" in front of the group, and de-emphasize reason in favor of "feeling and action." The authors also described graduates of est as "fiercely loyal," and said that it recruited heavily, reducing marketing expenses to virtually zero. The last est training was held in December 1984 in San Francisco.

It was replaced by a gentler course called "The Forum," which began in January 1985. "est, Inc." evolved into "est, an Educational Corporation," and eventually into Werner Erhard and Associates. In 1991 the business was sold to the employees who formed a new company called Landmark Education with Erhard's brother, Harry Rosenberg, becoming the CEO. Landmark Education was structured as a for-profit, employee-owned company; it operates as Landmark Worldwide with a consulting division called Vanto Group.

Early influences 

In W. W. Bartley III's biography of Werner Erhard, Werner Erhard: The Transformation of a Man, the Founding of est (1978), Erhard describes his explorations of Zen Buddhism. Bartley quotes Erhard as acknowledging Zen as the essential contribution that "created the space [for est]".

Bartley details Erhard's connections with Zen beginning with his extensive studies with Alan Watts in the mid-1960s.
Bartley quotes Erhard as acknowledging:

Other influences included Dale Carnegie, Subud, Scientology and Mind Dynamics.

Timeline 

 1971 – Erhard Seminars Training Inc, first est Training held in San Francisco, California
 1973 – The Foundation for the Realization of Man – incorporated as a non-profit foundation in California (subsequently the name of the foundation was changed to the est Foundation in 1976, and in 1981 to the Werner Erhard Foundation)
 1975 – est, an educational corporation.
 1977 – The first est training outside of the United States, in London.
 1977 – The Hunger Project was established
 1979 – The first est training in India
 1980 – The first est training in Israel
 1980 – The Breakthrough Foundation was established (Youth at Risk)
 1981 – First of ten annual physicist conferences sponsored by the est Foundation
 1981 – est became Werner Erhard and Associates
 1984 – The last training was held under the name of est

Related organizations 
 The Hunger Project
 Werner Erhard and Associates
 Landmark Worldwide

See also 
 EST and The Forum in popular culture
 Getting It: The Psychology of est
 Human Potential Movement
 Large-group awareness training
 List of large-group awareness training organizations
 Outrageous Betrayal

References

Further reading 
Bartley, III, William Warren: Werner Erhard The Transformation of a Man: The Founding of est, New York, New York, USA: Clarkson N. Potter, Inc (1978) .
Bry, Adelaide: est: 60 Hours That Transform Your Life, Harper Collins (1976) 
Fenwick, Sheridan: Getting It: The Psychology of est, J. B. Lippincott Company. (1976) 
Hargrove, Robert: est: Making Life Work, Delacorte (1976) 
Kettle, James: The est Experience, Zebra Books (1976) 
Marks, Pat R.: est: The Movement and the Man, Playboy Press (1976) ASIN B004BI5A3E
Moreno, M.D., Ph.D., Jonathan D. Impromptu Man: J. L. Moreno and the Origins of Psychodrama, Encounter Culture, and the Social Network. Bellevue Literary Press (2014) 
Pressman, Steven: Outrageous Betrayal: The Dark Journey of Werner Erhard from est to Exile
Rhinehart, Luke: The Book of est, Holt, Rinehart and Winston (1976)

External links 

Werner Erhard
1971 establishments in California
1971 in San Francisco
1984 disestablishments in California
Companies based in San Francisco
Companies disestablished in 1984
Companies established in 1971
Defunct companies based in the San Francisco Bay Area
Large-group awareness training
Privately held companies based in California
Self religions